The men's 4x400 metres relay event at the 2006 World Junior Championships in Athletics was held in Beijing, China, at Chaoyang Sports Centre on 19 and 20 August.

Medalists

Results

Final
20 August

Heats
19 August

Heat 1

Heat 2

Heat 3

Participation
According to an unofficial count, 84 athletes from 19 countries participated in the event.

References

4 x 400 metres relay
Relays at the World Athletics U20 Championships